Saragachhi is a railway station of the Sealdah-Lalgola line in the Eastern Railway zone of Indian Railways. The station is situated beside National Highway 34 at Sargachi village in Murshidabad district in the Indian state of West Bengal. It serves Sargachi and surroundings village areas. Total 12 trains including Lalogola Passengers and few EMUs stop in this station. The distance between Sargachi and Sealdah is 206 km (128 mi).

Electrification
The Krishnanagar– Section, including Sargachi railway station was electrified in 2004. In 2010 the line became double tracked.

References

Railway stations in Murshidabad district
Sealdah railway division
Kolkata Suburban Railway stations